Michael Brennan (born 1973) is an Australian poet. He is editor of the Australian sector of Poetry International Web and is the co-founder of publisher Vagabond Press.

Early life and education 
Brennan was born in Sydney in 1973. He completed his Ph.D. at the University of Sydney in 2001, where he wrote his thesis: The Impossible Gaze: Robert Adamson and the work of negativity. During his time at the University of Sydney, Brennan co-edited the university's undergraduate literary journal, Hermes, an annual magazine which publishes the works of students at the university. He also began writing a journal for a class taught by Elizabeth Webby who was the editor of the Australian literary magazine Southerly from 1988 to 1999. Webby asked Brennan to work on Southerly, an opportunity which Brennan has referred to, saying “That was my real start”. While Brennan was living in Paris in 1998, he was inspired by Blanchot's Chapbooks, which had been published by Fata Morgana, and on his return to the University of Sydney in 1999,  Michael Brennan founded and began directing The Vagabond Press, his own independent literary press.

Poetic work, books and awards 

Brennan has written six individual collections of poetry to date and two collaborative works, with a style described by David McCooey of Jacket Magazine as “a strange, sometimes surreal, world, to illustrate the possible foreignness of any place, even home”. His first book, titled The Imageless World was published in 2003 by Salt Publishing. The collection is described on Google Books as “Dipping between parody and mourning”, and contains three sections: Youth, Excavation Series and Pop Currency. The Imageless World was shortlisted for the NSW Premier's Award for Poetry and was the winner of the Mary Gilmore Award.

In 2004, Brennan won the Marten Bequest Travelling Scholarship, and, funded by the Literature Board of the Australian Council for the Arts, and a Nancy Keesing studio residency at the Cité internationale des Arts, Paris, he was able to live abroad in both Berlin and Paris. Whilst living abroad, Brennan wrote his second collection and first chapbook: Language Habits (chapbook), and published it in 2006.
Brennan has also co-written two poetry books. Following the release of Language Habits, Brennan collaborated with Akiko Muto, a Japanese artist, to create his second chapbook titled ‘Sky was sky’, which was a dedication to David Brennan, who died in 1999. Sky was translated by Yasuhiro Yotsumoto, and published in 2007. It made a second appearance in his 2008 book Unanimous Night. Brennan's second collaborative work was an art book: Atopia, which was produced with Kay Orchison, a Sydney-based artist, and also made a reappearance in Unanimous Night.
Brennan's third individual collection, “Unanimous night” was published in 2008 by Salt Publishing, and is a continuation of “The Imageless World”, part two of a triptych of books. The two books are connected through “repeating motifs (which) thread both volumes” (McCooey, D. 2008), and share a similar structure of contents. Unanimous Night was shortlisted for the Victorian Premier's Award for Poetry and won the William Baylebridge Award.

The third book in Brennan's triptych is titled “Autoethnographic” and was published in 2012 by Giramondo Publishing co., taking place in a dystopian future setting where “there is global warming, social breakdown, closed airports and borders, and so on”. Autoethnographic was the recipient of the Grace Leven Prize for Poetry in 2012 and was shortlisted for the Victorian Premier's Literary award for poetry in 2014. In a review by Dr Tamryn Bennett, writer and visual artist, on Autoethnographic, she stated “If pressed to find fault with Autoethnographic, it is that the poignancy Brennan's observations are, at times, undercut by predictable lineation and prosaic page composition”.

Brennan's fifth individual book is titled “Alibi” and was published in 2015 by his own publishing company, the Vagabond Press. The book Alibi is alternatively available in Japanese, translated by Yasuhiro Yotsumoto, who also translated his Sky was sky chapbook. One of the poems in Alibi, titled “Who is Alibi Wednesday?”, was written as part of the Red Room Company's  2004 project Toilet Doors Poetry, and was used alongside the work of five other Australian poets, as posters on the back of toilet doors. Another of the poems in the collection Alibi, titled “Alibi at the Start of Summer” was published in the book “The Best Australian Poems 2010” edited by Robert Adamson, the same poet whose work Brennan wrote his Thesis on, and published by Black inc. Brennan was also featured in Pam Brown's Fifty-one contemporary poets from Australia: Part 5. The poems featured were "After the circus” and “Lost Soldier” from his Language Habits chapbook, and “You Yangs 1” from Best Australian Poems 2010. Brennan's poetry was also featured in Lisa Gorton's Collection of The Best Australian Poems 2013, which was published by Black inc. on the 13th of October, 2013.

In May 2016, Brennan contributed to the Chicago-based Poetry Foundation's monthly poetry collection focused on Australian poets, with his poem ‘There and Then’.  

Brennan's sixth individual book is titled “The Earth Here”, the same name of a poem featured in his Unanimous Night collection. The Earth Here was published by ASM in 2018.

Published Collections (in order of release) 
 The Imageless World, 2003 (Salt Publishing)
 Language Habits (Chapbook), 2006 (The Vagabond Press)
 Sky was Sky (with Akiko Muto), 2007, translated by Yasuhiro Yotsumoto (The Vagabond Press)
 Atopia (with Kay Orchison), 2008
 Unanimous Night, 2008 (Salt Publishing)
 Autoethnographic, 2012 (Giramondo Publishing co.)
 Alibi, 2015 (The Vagabond Press)
 Alibi, 2015, Japanese Edition, translated by Yasuhiro Yotsumoto (The Vagabond Press)
 The Earth Here, 2018 (ASM)

Teaching and other external work

Teaching 
From 2004 to 2019, Brennan lived in Tokyo and worked as an author, editor, critic and professor. Brennan has taught English literature and cultural studies at universities in both Australia and Japan. In 2019, he resigned from his role of associate professor and lecturer at Chuo University in the faculty of Policy Studies, to return to Sydney to focus on writing and publishing with the Vagabond Press.

Editing 
Brennan has contributed as an editor to a number of texts, including Absence and Negativity, published by Halstead in 2000, Calyx: 30 Contemporary Australian Poets, published by Paper Bark Press and co-edited by Peter Minter in 2000, and Noel Rowe's Posthumous collection: A Cool and Shaded Heart: Collected poems, published by Vagabond Press in 2008.

Poetry International Web 
Brennan has also contributed to the Poetry International Website as the Australian editor since 2004, conducting introductions, interviews and criticism.Brennan sees the Australian section of Poetry International Web “as both an online quarterly journal and as an archive of Australian poetry” and attempts to “engage the determination of 'Australia' and 'Australian poetry' in the introduction of each issue”. In regards to the Australian section of Poetry International Web, Michael Brennan has stated “I would like to keep building the site so that it becomes more inclusive, better able to show the sheer breadth of difference available in poetry stemming from Australia” 

In regards to the international connections made through Poetry International Web, Brennan has said “one of the most exciting aspects of the Poetry International Website, (is) the ability to move beyond the pragmatic boundaries of nation, and support engagements that might otherwise not happen”.

Brennan has contributed as a critic for Australian Book Review.

Vagabond Press 

Brennan first began publishing with the Vagabond Press in July, 1999. The first titles published by the Vagabond Press were two chapbooks, ‘The Dead’ written by poet David Brooks and ‘Falling Objects’ by Nick Riemer. The chapbooks were the first of the Rare Objects Series, which would grow to include over 100 different collections by 2014. All titles in the series are written by Australian poets. The concept of the Rare Objects Series is that there are only a limited number of copies of each title, with only 100 being published each time. Each copy of each title throughout the series was signed by the author, and given a number from 1–100. The Vagabond Press has stated that the series was based on “a combination of the design values of French press Fata Morgana and Neil Astley's beautiful Poetical Histories series”.

Brennan has stated that the Vagabond Press “started with $500 and … basically built from there”  and that he looks for “shared commitment” in the authors he chooses to publishes, due to the limited resources that the Vagabond Press has to work with. In his interview with Australian Book Review for Publisher of the Month, Brennan stated “Twenty years of unpaid labour followed” the founding of the Vagabond Press. The Vagabond Press has published the work of writers from Australia, France, England and America.

Work that Brennan has published with The Vagabond Press includes Kate Lilley's award-winning poetry collection Tilt, which won the Victorian Premier's Literary Award for Poetry in 2019. In an interview with The University of Sydney, Lilley stated “My publisher, Michael Brennan, started Vagabond Press at this university and has built a wonderful list. I'm immensely grateful to him”.

Whilst the home base for the Vagabond Press is in Marrickville, Sydney, Australia, Brennan spent 15 years publishing abroad in Japan, from 2004 to 2019.On Brennan's return to Sydney he planned to increase the sustainability of The Vagabond Press and “explore new trajectories, such as novellas and essays”.

References 

1973 births
Living people
Poets from Sydney
University of Sydney alumni